This is a list of works of art at Newfields, the campus that also contains the Indianapolis Museum of Art which are located outside, on one of three campus locations:
 The Virginia B. Fairbanks Art & Nature Park: 100 Acres 
 Indianapolis Museum of Art grounds
 Oldfields-Lilly House and The Gardens at Newfields.

There are also artworks that the museum has out on loan, and those that have been deaccessioned.

References

Newfields
Culture of Indianapolis
Outdoor sculptures in Indianapolis
Public art in the United States

Indianapolis Museum of Art